John Henry Rogers (1867 – 30 March 1922) was an English rugby union forward who played club rugby for Moseley Rugby Football Club and international rugby for England. In 1890 Rogers became one of the original members of the Barbarians Football Club.

Bibliography

References

1867 births
1922 deaths
English rugby union players
England international rugby union players
Rugby union forwards
Barbarian F.C. players
Rugby union players from Birmingham, West Midlands
Moseley Rugby Football Club players